Lilapur is a village in Ahmedabad district, Gujarat, India.

References

Villages in Ahmedabad district
Settlements in Gujarat